Östersunds-Posten, simply ÖP, is a Swedish language local newspaper published in Östersund, Sweden. The paper has been in circulation since 1877.

History and profile
Östersunds-Posten was established in 1877. Its headquarters is in Östersund. The Erfa-group was the owner of the paper until 1975 when it was acquired by the Centertidningar, a media company owned by the Center Party. The paper was sold to a newspaper consortium, including the companies of Stampen, Mittmedia, and Eskilstunakuriren and became part of MittMedia Förvaltning AB. 

The political leaning of Östersunds-Posten is center-right. The paper was published in broadsheet format until Fall 2004 when it began to be published in half Nordic format. It has a weekend supplement, Lørdag. 

The paper started its website in 1994. In 2005 Östersunds-Posten was named as the Europe's Best Designed Newspaper and awarded the European Newspaper Award in the category of local newspapers.

Circulation
In 2010 Östersunds-Posten sold 26,400 copies. The circulation of the paper fell to 23,400 copies in 2012 and to 21,800 copies in 2013.

See also
List of Swedish newspapers

References

External links
 Official website

Östersunds-Posten
Mass media in Östersund
Östersunds-Posten
Östersunds-Posten
Östersunds-Posten